Touch Down may refer to:

"Touch Down" (song), by Stylo G, 2018
"Touch Down", a song by Comus from To Keep from Crying, 1974
"Touch Down", a song by Koda Kumi, a B-side of the single "Summer Trip", 2013
"Touch Down", a song by KSI, 2017
"Touch Down", a song by Show-Ya from Masquerade Show, 1985

See also
Touchdown (disambiguation)